Iolaus paneperata, the parallel sapphire, is a butterfly in the family Lycaenidae. The species was first described by Hamilton Herbert Druce in 1890. It is found in Sierra Leone, Ivory Coast, Ghana, Togo, Nigeria (south and the Cross River loop), Cameroon, the Republic of the Congo and the Democratic Republic of the Congo (Kinshasa and possibly Kwango).

The larvae feed on the flowers of Loranthus incanus and Phragmanthera capitata. They are green and resemble the flowers on which they feed.

References

External links

Die Gross-Schmetterlinge der Erde 13: Die Afrikanischen Tagfalter. Plate XIII 67 e

Butterflies described in 1890
Iolaus (butterfly)
Butterflies of Africa